Patti is a town and comune in northeastern Sicily, southern Italy, administratively part of the Metropolitan City of Messina, on the western shore of the gulf of the same name.

It is connected to the rest of Sicily by train, via the Patti-San Piero Patti train station, located on the railway line Messina-Palermo, and the A20 Palermo-Messina highway.

It is best known for the remains of its rich monumental Roman Villa and for the impressive ruins of ancient city of Tyndaris nearby.

Patti is also famous for its large sandy beaches.

History 

The current town name derives from Ep' Aktin (Ἐπ' Ἀκτήν, Greek for 'on the shore'), the name given by its inhabitants after they moved from Tindari following an earthquake that destroyed it.

The town was founded by the Norman king Roger II of Sicily in 1094.

Patti was destroyed by Frederick of Aragon about 1300, on account of its attachment to the House of Anjou; rebuilt in the 16th century, it was later sacked by the Ottoman Turks.

Main sights

Ruins of Tindari
Remains of a Roman Villa (3rd century AD)
Necropolises of Monte (10th through 8th centuries BC) and san Cosimo (3rd millennium BC through 9th century BC)
Cathedral (10th century), housing the sepulchre of Adelasia Countess of Sicily, wife of Roger I.

People 
 Michele Sindona, banker and convicted criminal
 Michelangelo Rampulla
 Antonio "Tony" Cairoli.

See also
Diocese of Patti

References

Sources

 Michele Fasolo, Tyndaris e il suo territorio I. Introduzione alla carta archeologica del territorio di Tindari, Roma 2013,  https://books.google.com/books?isbn=8890875518
 Michele Fasolo, Tyndaris e il suo territorio II. Carta archeologica del territorio di Tindari e materiali, Roma 2014,  https://books.google.com/books?isbn=8890875526

Municipalities of the Metropolitan City of Messina